Sam Menning (January 5, 1925 – March 29, 2010) was an American character actor and photographer.

Menning began his career in the 1950s as a photographer in New York City before switching to acting during the 1980s. His talent agent, Bonnie Howard, made him her first professional client. Howard noted that Menning was the last person to photograph pin-up model Bettie Page before her retirement from the modelling industry.

Before becoming a professional actor in the 1980s, Menning worked in a number of positions within the entertainment industry, including a still photographer, grip, gaffer and lighting technician. His television credits included Yes, Dear, Sabrina the Teenage Witch (in the episode "Pancake Madness"), and In Case of Emergency, and he portrayed a homeless man called Pickled Egg Guy in My Name Is Earl. In film, Menning appeared in Mel Brooks' 1991 movie Life Stinks, portrayed another homeless man in Speedway Junky, and a blind stagehand in the 2006 thriller, The Prestige, directed by Christopher Nolan.

Sam Menning died of emphysema at Providence Saint Joseph Medical Center in Burbank, California, on March 31, 2010, at the age of 85. He was survived by his daughter Sherree Casusol, and her four children; his brother, Rod Menning, and his nephew Garrett Menning. His memorial service was held at Angeleno Valley Mortuary in North Hollywood.

References

External links

1925 births
2010 deaths
American male television actors
American male film actors
American photographers
20th-century American male actors